Desaix may refer to:

Louis Desaix (1768–1800), French general
, a French Navy 74-gun ship of the line launched in 1793, renamed Desaix in 1800, and wrecked in 1802
, a French Navy armored cruiser in commission from 1904 to 1921
, a destroyer transferred to the French Navy as Desaix after World War II